In mathematics, in the field of measure theory, τ-additivity is a certain property of measures on topological spaces.

A measure or set function  on a space  whose domain is a sigma-algebra  is said to be  if for any upward-directed family  of nonempty open sets such that its union is in  the measure of the union is the supremum of measures of elements of  that is,:

See also

References

 .

Measure theory